Shabazi (Shabbazi, Shabbezi, El-Shibzi may refer to:

 Shalom Shabazi, a 17th-century Jewish poet
 Alireza Shapour Shahbazi (1942–2006), an Iranian archeologist and historian
 Shabazi Street, a main street in Rosh Haayin, Israel